University South Campus station, often referred to as simply South Campus station, is a light rail station on the campus of the University of Utah in Salt Lake City, Utah, United States serviced by the Red Line of the Utah Transit Authority's (UTA) TRAX light rail system. The Red Line provides service from the University of Utah Medical Center to the Daybreak community of South Jordan.

Description 
The station is located on the campus of the University of Utah at 1790 East South Campus Drive with the island platform situated in the middle of that street. Northeast of the station is the Jon M. Huntsman Center and immediately south of the station is the LDS Institute of the Church of Jesus Christ of Latter-day Saints (LDS Church). Unlike many TRAX stations, University South Campus does not have a Park and Ride lot, however, the Church of Jesus Christ of Latter-day Saints allows parking at the Institute parking garage southeast of the station for those who purchase a $22.00 Transit Parking Pass. The station is part of a railway right of way that was created specifically for the former University Line. The station opened on 29 September 2003 and is operated by the Utah Transit Authority.

References 

TRAX (light rail) stations
Railway stations in the United States opened in 2003
Railway stations in Salt Lake City
2003 establishments in Utah
Railway stations in the United States at university and college campuses